John Edward Deasy (born 1961 in East Providence, Rhode Island) is an American businessman who served as the superintendent of Stockton Unified School District from June 1, 2018 to June 15, 2020. Prior to that, Deasy served as the superintendent for Los Angeles Unified School District from 2011 to 2014, Prince George's County Public Schools from 2006 to 2008, Santa Monica–Malibu Unified School District from 2001 to 2006, and Coventry Public Schools from 1996 to 2001.

Career

Early career (1983–1996) 
Deasy started as a teacher of chemistry, biology and earth science before becoming the assistant principal of La Salle Military Academy in 1984. He became the director of personnel of Coventry Public Schools in 1987, the principal of Lake George Junior/Senior High School in 1983, and the principal of Coventry High School in 1993.

Santa Monica–Malibu Unified School District (2001–2006) 
In 2001, Deasy was picked to head the Santa Monica–Malibu Unified School District, replacing Neil Schmidt who retired in the summer. He was picked out of sixty applications and moved to California with his eldest daughter while his wife Pat Deasy and their two younger children coming in January 2002. During his tenure, the district ranked higher than the Los Angeles County average for the 2004–2005 school year.

In 2006, Deasy was picked as a finalist for the superintendent for Prince George's County Public Schools, and in February 2006, resigned as superintendent of SMMUSD.

Prince George's County Public Schools and Bill & Melinda Gates Foundation (2006–2010) 
Deasy started as superintendent at Prince George's County Public Schools on May 1, 2006. He was elected unanimously in February 2006 and was the fifth superintendent in a decade. During this time, there was controversy due to discrepancies in his records, which say that Deasy received his doctorate from the University of Louisville with only nine credit hours. In his resume for Prince George’s Schools, he put the he received his master's in 1987 while Providence College records show that he received it on May 21, 1989. The University of Louisville formed a six-member blue-ribbon committee to investigate the discrepancies for Deasy's degree, but University president James R. Ramsey said that they found no violations. Mike Petrilli, president of the Thomas B. Fordham Institute, said that his credentials did not matter but the results of his tenure did.

After two years, Deasy announced his plans to resign to take a job offered by the Bill & Melinda Gates Foundation. He served as the Deputy Director of Education at the Bill & Melinda Gates Foundation for three years before being hired by the Los Angeles Unified School District as a deputy superintendent.

Los Angeles Unified School District (2010–2014) 
Deasy started serving as deputy superintendent of LUASD in August 2010. On January 11, 2011, the LAUSD school board voted 6-0 to name Deasy as superintendent, with only Board member Steve Zimmer abstaining. During his tenue, the District saw improved test scores and graduation rates and lower suspension rates, but was criticized for uncompromising positions on teacher evaluation and employment.

In 2013, he embarked on a mission to give iPads to all 650,000 students in the school, and was met with criticisms about how they were more expensive than other tablets from other manufacturers. That same year, his contract with LAUSD was extended to 2016. He also introduced the My Integrated Student Information System (MISiS), which was criticized for randomly disappearing grades and assignments.
In 2013, he embarked on a mission to give iPads to all 650,000 students in the school, and was met with criticisms about how they were more expensive than other tablets from other manufacturers. That same year, his contract with LAUSD was extended to 2016. He also introduced the My Integrated Student Information System (MISiS), which was criticized for randomly disappearing grades and assignments.

In 2014, it was revealed that Deasy had ties to Apple Inc., the makers of the iPad, and Pearson PLC, creators of applications on the iPads, raising questions about the bidding process. Deasy resigned on October 16, 2014 after mounting criticisms and the failed iPad program. He remained in the district with a special assignment until the end of the year and received about 60 days pay, which totaled to $60,000. Cortines was picked to become superintendent again in an interim capacity. After Deasy's resignation, there was speculation about who would replace him as an official superintendent, but it was decided that, after Cortines, deputy superintendent Michelle King would become superintendent. In December 2014, the Federal Bureau of Investigation seized records from LAUSD pertaining to the iPad program.

The Broad Center (2015–2018) 
In 2015, he landed a job as a consultant for the Broad Center, funded by Eli Broad. He also served as a superintendent-in-residence for the Broad Academy. He continued until 2018.

Clark County School District election and Stockton Unified School District (2018–2020) 
On April 6, the Clark County School District announced the top four candidates for a, which included Deasy. His pick was controversial due to his resignation with LAUSD. On April 12, Deasy  announced that he would withdraw from the election. The announcement came after the School Board of Trustees said that they would extend the search timeline and look for internal candidates.

In May 2018, Deasy was picked to become the superintendent of Stockton Unified School District. With this, there questions rose about his credentials like they did during his PGCPS tenure. In April 2020, Deasy announced that he would resign as superintendent.
The board accepted his resignation with a vote of 4-3, with then-mayor of Stockton Michael Tubbs opposing the move.

Personal life 
According to Deasy, he earned his Master's degree and Bachelor's degree from Providence College and his PhD from the University of Louisville. The validity of his PhD has been called into question. Deasy also received the Service to Education Award by Providence at their 2013 reunion.

His wife, Patricia Deasy, is a nurse practitioner and has three children. Deasy described himself as a liberal, supporting Howard Dean during his 2004 presidential campaign.

He received a Service to Education Award by Providence College in 2013.

References 

1961 births
Los Angeles Unified School District superintendents
Providence College alumni
University of Louisville alumni
Living people